The Prelude in D major, Op. 23 No. 4 is a 1903 composition by Sergei Rachmaninoff. It is part of Rachmaninoff's Ten Preludes, Op. 23.

Structure 

The prelude is in ternary form. The theme of the main section is introduced in measure 3:

Measure 3

The theme is in the form of a period, composed of two symmetrical phrases, the consequent being a more embellished version of the antecedent, presenting a triplet descant in the treble voice above the main theme in the right-hand alto voice. The right-hand voices are offset against an eighth-note figure in the left-hand:

Measure 19

The middle section presents rhythmic changes and several modulations. Triplets appear in the accompaniment, and shorter phrasing is utilized:

Measures 35 and 36

The piece reaches its climax at measures 50–51, and immediately resolves back into the main section:

Measures 50 and 51

Here, the triplet flow returns to the left-hand bass line, while a high counterpoint is introduced in the main melody. Only the antecedent of the original phrase is recapitulated, lengthened by eight additional measures that provide closure.

Measures 53 and 54

Recordings 
 YouTube Live Recording Live by Willis Miller (2012).

References

External links 

 Detailed 5-layer analysis (by Lance Bastian)

Preludes by Sergei Rachmaninoff
Compositions in D major